The Maraic languages are a branch of Kuki-Chin languages.

Languages
The Maraic languages are (VanBik 2009:23):
Mara (Tlôsaih)
Lyvaw (Lochei and Chira)
Sizo (Chapi, Ngaphe and Sabyu)
Lutuv (Lytu/Kahno)
Zophei (Vawngtu,Leitak)
Senthang
Zotung (Calthawng, Innmai, Lungngo)
Hlaipao (Vahapi [Zyhno], Heima and Lialai)

Sound changes
VanBik (2009) lists the following sound changes from Proto-Kuki-Chin to Proto-Maraic.
Proto-Kuki-Chin *-p, *-t, *-k > Proto-Maraic *-ʔ
Proto-Kuki-Chin *-ʔ > Proto-Maraic zero
Proto-Kuki-Chin *-r, *-l > Proto-Maraic zero
Proto-Kuki-Chin *kr- > Proto-Maraic *ts-

References

Peterson, David. 2017. "On Kuki-Chin subgrouping." In Picus Sizhi Ding and Jamin Pelkey, eds. Sociohistorical linguistics in Southeast Asia: New horizons for Tibeto-Burman studies in honor of David Bradley, 189-209. Leiden: Brill.
VanBik, Kenneth. 2009. Proto-Kuki-Chin: A Reconstructed Ancestor of the Kuki-Chin Languages. STEDT Monograph 8. .